John Gagliardi is the name of:

 John Gagliardi (1926–2018), American college football coach
 John Gagliardi (Australian), businessman, public speaker, political lobbyist, founder of the Australian Christian Lobby (ACL)
 John Gagliardi (lacrosse) (born 1974), American lacrosse player